The Tesla Personal Supercomputer is a desktop computer (personal supercomputer) that is backed by Nvidia and built by various hardware vendors. It is meant to be a demonstration of the capabilities of Nvidia's Tesla GPGPU brand; it utilizes Nvidia's CUDA parallel computing architecture and is powered by up to 2688 parallel processing cores per GPGPU, which allow it to achieve speeds up to 250 times faster than standard PCs, according to Nvidia.

See also 
 Nvidia Tesla
 Fastra II

References

External links 
 Tesla Personal Supercomputer website
 NVIDIA Delivers the Personal Supercomputer DE Online
 Nvidia Tesla YouTube channel

Nvidia products
Computer workstations